Marco Romano (born 6 May 1953) is an Italian fencer and physician. He won a silver medal in the team sabre event at the 1980 Summer Olympics. He works as professor and physician at the Second University of Naples and in 2013 was elected councilor for the  'Società Italiana di Gastroenterologia' in the National  Societies Forum (NSF) of the United European Gastroenterology.

References

External links
 

1953 births
Living people
Italian male fencers
Olympic fencers of Italy
Fencers at the 1980 Summer Olympics
Olympic silver medalists for Italy
Fencers from Naples
Olympic medalists in fencing
Medalists at the 1980 Summer Olympics